Irving Rudolph Pray (December 25, 1886 – August 27, 1948) was an American football coach. He served as the head football coach at Norwich University in Northfield, Vermont from 1913 to 1914 and Louisiana State University (LSU) for part of the 1916 season and for full seasons in 1919 and 1922, compiling a career college football coaching record of 11–20.

Pray was a graduate of the Massachusetts Institute of Technology. He was born in Natick, Massachusetts and died in Alexandria, Louisiana.

Pray was the head football coach at Natick High School, in hometown in 1911. In 1915, he appointed head football coach at Salem High School in Salem, Massachusetts, succeeding Harold McDevitt.

Head coaching record

College football

*<small>First 5 games of season were coached by E. T. MacDonnell and the last 3 by Dana X. Bible.

See also
 List of college football head coaches with non-consecutive tenure

References

1886 births
1948 deaths
LSU Tigers football coaches
Norwich Cadets football coaches
High school baseball coaches in the United States
High school football coaches in Massachusetts
Massachusetts Institute of Technology alumni
People from Natick, Massachusetts
Sportspeople from Middlesex County, Massachusetts
Coaches of American football from Massachusetts
Baseball coaches from Massachusetts